Shturbino is a rural locality (a selo) in Ulyapskoye Rural Settlement of Krasnogvardeysky District, Adygea, Russia. The population was 491 as of 2018. There are 11 streets.

Geography 
Shturbino is located 28 km southeast of Krasnogvardeyskoye (the district's administrative centre) by road. Ulyap is the nearest rural locality.

References 

Rural localities in Krasnogvardeysky District